Microbacterium arthrosphaerae is a Gram-positive and rod-shaped bacterium from the genus Microbacterium which has been isolated from the pill millipede Arthrosphaera magna in India.

References

External links
Type strain of Microbacterium arthrosphaerae at BacDive -  the Bacterial Diversity Metadatabase	

Bacteria described in 2011
arthrosphaerae